is beef small intestine, which may be grilled or fried. It is consumed in many Latin American countries.

In some countries,  is grilled over wood or charcoal. In Colombia, Argentina, Paraguay, Uruguay, Peru,  Chile and Ecuador, however, it is usually roasted. Despite its long cooking requirement, it is usually the first dish served in a Paraguayan, Uruguayan, or Argentinian asado.

They are presented in the form of a braid.

Names and characteristics according to country

Argentina, Uruguay, and Paraguay
The large intestine, in Argentina, is called  ('big tripe') or torch and cooked similarly, except that they are usually washed inside and filled with the same filling for sausages.

Chile

Colombia
Usually eaten fresh.

Ecuador
It is grilled and popularly known as street food.

Venezuela

Peru
In Peru this meal is known by a Creole term:  . Prepared steamed and then roasted on a grill, it is a food native to the people of Angola, who were brought to the south of Peru to work the cotton and sugar fields in the province of Ica, south of Lima. It was a food typical of the black population of Peru but now, like kebabs, it is consumed at every social level.

Mexico
This is washed thoroughly with tap water, braided and boiled in a pressure cooker for about one hour, because it is very hard. Later, it is fried with garlic and onions and served on fresh tortillas, whole or chopped into cubes, served with hot salsa.

See also 
 Chitterlings
 Gopchang

References 

Colombian cuisine
Peruvian cuisine